Anthony Pellicano (born March 22, 1944) is a high-profile Los Angeles private investigator and convicted criminal known as a Hollywood fixer. He served a term of thirty months in a federal prison for illegal possession of explosives, firearms, and a grenade. In 2008, he began serving an additional sentence for subsequent convictions for other crimes, including racketeering and wiretapping. Several other people were also convicted of crimes associated with their involvement with his illegal activities, including his actress girlfriend Sandra Will Carradine (ex-wife of Keith Carradine), film director John McTiernan, Beverly Hills police officer Craig Stevens, Los Angeles police sergeant Mark Arneson, and attorney Terry Christensen.

Early life and career 

Pellicano was born and grew up in Chicago, Illinois.
After serving in the military, he moved to Los Angeles. Pellicano became an instant celebrity for his excellent work on a John DeLorean case defense.

Pellicano became a private investigator that was often utilized over the years by Hollywood celebrities, for a large retainer, because of his reputation as a fixer who was adept at solving their problems.

Criminal activities and subsequent legal matters 
An investigation into Pellicano began after journalist and former The Hollywood Reporter editor Anita Busch found that her car had been vandalized in 2002. The windshield was broken and a dead fish and rose were left on the car along with a sign that said "Stop".

On November 21, 2002, FBI agents raided the offices of Pellicano. A threat had been made against film producer Julius R. Nasso, who was suing Steven Seagal. The FBI was looking for evidence that Pellicano was involved in making the threat against Nasso. The FBI agents found two practice grenades which were modified to function as homemade bombs and military-grade C-4 plastic explosive. Pellicano pleaded guilty to the illegal possession of dangerous materials. His sentence was thirty months in federal prison. His date of release was to be February 4, 2006. On February 3, Pellicano was transferred to the metropolitan detention center in Downtown Los Angeles to face new charges.

On February 4, 2006, Pellicano was formally arrested on additional charges. On February 6, 2006, in United States District Court for the Central District of California in Los Angeles, Pellicano was indicted on 110 counts. His alleged crimes included racketeering, conspiracy, wiretapping, witness tampering, identity theft and destruction of evidence. Specifically, Pellicano was charged with receiving unlawfully accessed confidential records on celebrities and public figures from members of the Los Angeles and Beverly Hills police departments. For example, prosecutors alleged that Pellicano tapped the phones of Sylvester Stallone and Keith Carradine and accessed the confidential police records of Garry Shandling and Kevin Nealon. On February 15, 2006, the indictment was amended to include further charges of wiretapping and extortion. Pellicano was denied bail. In June 2006 the Los Angeles Times reported that Pellicano performed an illegal background check on a law enforcement official who was investigating a fake passport scheme involving Pellicano's client, Christophe Rocancourt.

The jury trial of Pellicano was to commence on February 27, 2008. The trial was delayed three times, due to a lengthy discovery process and retaining of defense counsel.

On May 15, 2008, he and four others (Mark Arneson, Ray Turner, Kevin Kachikian, and Abner Nicherie) were found guilty of various charges involving  wiretapping, racketeering, wire fraud, and computer fraud. Pellicano had represented himself in the trial, and had not testified in his own defense. (Abner Nicherie's conviction was later overturned on appeal.)

In August 2008, Pellicano was convicted of wiretapping and conspiracy to commit wiretapping in the Federal District Court in Los Angeles. In December 2008, the court denied Pellicano's request for concurrent sentencing. Fifteen years were added to Pellicano's prison sentence and he was fined $2,000,000.

On August 29, 2008, Pellicano was found guilty of conspiracy to commit wiretapping. Specifically, Pellicano had recorded phone conversations of Kirk Kerkorian's ex-wife, Lisa Kerkorian, in an effort to disprove her claims that Kerkorian was the father of her daughter. Sentencing was scheduled for November 2008 then deferred to December 15, 2008. Pellicano was sentenced to 15 years in federal prison. The U.S. 9th Circuit Court of Appeals upheld the majority of his convictions, overturning only two for aiding and abetting computer fraud and unauthorized computer access.  The most serious convictions, for running a criminal enterprise, remain intact.

Pellicano was incarcerated at FCI, Big Spring in Texas and later at Terminal Island in California.

On August 7, 2011, Pellicano gave his first interview to Newsweek magazine. On July 5, 2012, Pellicano's bail hearing was postponed due to poor health. The following day Tom Cruise was accused of conspiring with Pellicano to create a wiretap during Cruise's divorce from Nicole Kidman.

He was released on March 22, 2019. In 2022, his probation ended, and he works as a self-described "negotiator" for people such as Daryl Katz and Joel Silver, mostly involving corporate disputes with the "occasional" #MeToo case.

Related investigations 
On January 11, 2006, Pellicano's girlfriend Sandra Will Carradine (the ex-wife of Keith Carradine, who had hired Pellicano in preparation for her divorce, leading to his wiretapping of Keith Carradine's phone line) and veteran Beverly Hills police officer Craig Stevens pleaded guilty to lying about Pellicano's crimes.

Los Angeles police sergeant Mark Arneson and phone company technician Rayford Turner were convicted of racketeering for their roles in helping Pellicano. Pellicano bribed Arneson to obtain access to law enforcement databases, and paid Turner for technical information about how to set up wiretaps. Pellicano, Arneson, and Turner were ordered to repay more than $2 million obtained from the racketeering. Software developer Kevin Kachikian was convicted of creating software used to record phone conversations.

In 2007, Israeli businessman and previously convicted swindler Daniel Nicherie was sentenced to four years in prison after pleading guilty to hiring Pellicano to wiretap another Hollywood businessman. As of late 2006, Nicherie was the seventh person to plead guilty in relation to the Pellicano investigation and the fifth to confirm Pellicano's involvement in wiretapping. Daniel Nicherie's brother Abner Nicherie was initially convicted for aiding and abetting a wiretapping of the phone of the husband of a woman whose business he wanted to take over, but his conviction was vacated in 2015.

Robert Joseph Pfeifer, at the time an executive at Hollywood Records, was a friend of Pellicano. Pfeifer was arrested on February 3, 2006, and charged with unlawful wiretapping and conspiracy. Pfeifer's then girlfriend, Erin Finn, assisted the FBI lead agent Stanley Ornellas in the investigation of Pfeifer and Pellicano.

On April 3, 2006, film director John McTiernan was charged with lying to the FBI about his relationship with Pellicano. On April 17, 2006, McTiernan pleaded guilty to the charge. On September 24, 2007, he was sentenced to four months in prison. The sentence was later increased to twelve months, and ultimately he was incarcerated in federal prison from April 2013 to February 2014. 

Dennis Wasser represented Tom Cruise in his divorce proceedings against Nicole Kidman. Wasser retained Pellicano. Tapes of telephone conversations from 2001, made shortly after the announcement of the divorce, were found in Pellicano's offices in 2002. Wasser was not charged but was made a person of interest.

Bert Fields was the subject of a federal grand jury investigation into illegal wiretapping, but was not charged with committing a crime. The Los Angeles Times reported, "Prosecutors are using the grand jury to investigate allegations involving Anthony Pellicano, a private investigator who worked for Fields and other entertainment industry figures. Investigators have told several of those they have questioned that they believe Pellicano wiretapped them. They are seeking to determine whether people who hired Pellicano may have authorized the surveillance or been aware of it." Fields regularly hired Pellicano, but he denied any knowledge of Pellicano's crimes. "I've been told that I am a subject, not a target, of the investigation," Fields said. "But I have never in any case had anything to do with illegal wiretapping. I don't do that."

On May 28, 2004, Anita Busch, reporter for the Los Angeles Times, commenced a civil action against Pellicano, alleging harassment, including a death threat made in 2002:

Kirk Kerkorian, a businessman, was married to Lisa Bonder. In August 2006, attorneys acting for Bonder sued the attorneys acting for Kerkorian. They accused Kerkorian's attorneys of retaining Pellicano to wiretap Bonder's phone during the divorce proceedings of Bonder and Kerkorian that involved a paternity dispute. Pellicano also investigated movie producer Steve Bing, who was a friend of Kerkorian. He took a strand of Bing's used dental floss and used it to prove that Bing was the father of Bonder's daughter. Between June 2000 and August 2002, Bing paid Pellicano $335,000. Between April and May 2002, Pellicano may have bragged to the attorney of Kerkorian that Bing had retained his services in relation to Bing being the father of another child with Elizabeth Hurley. However, Bing, through his attorney Martin Singer, later denied this, as did Pellicano. Attorney Terry Christensen was convicted of racketeering for hiring Pellicano to tap Bonder's phone, and received a three-year prison sentence.

Pellicano threatened financier Ron Burkle with extortion of  $100,000 to $250,000 to avoid investigation by Michael Ovitz, another of his clients.

In July 2006, The New York Times reporter and lawyer Allison Weiner unsuccessfully attempted to interview Pellicano in jail by misrepresenting herself as his attorney.

During the night of November 27, 1997, a five-month-old girl disappeared from the home of her parents, Steven and Marlene Aisenberg. In 1999, Pellicano was an FBI wiretap consultant in the investigation of the Aisenbergs, who were charged with making false statements to police. In 2001, the charges were dismissed after county detectives lied about obtaining warrants to wiretap and lied about the content of the wiretap recordings. 

Pellicano once represented the Chicago mobster Anthony "the Ant" Spilotro, charged with monitoring the Las Vegas casino and skimming for the Chicago mob. Pellicano served a subpoena and gave a warning from Spilotro to Gustave Reininger, co-creator of the NBC television drama Crime Story.

Pellicano had been in a relationship with actress Linda Fiorentino, described by Pellicano's attorney as "pen-pals", prior to going to prison when convicted of the crimes he was charged with in 2002. In 2006, when he was charged with new crimes just prior to his release from prison, Fiorentino started dating Federal Bureau of Investigation special agent Mark Rossini. She told Rossini that she was doing research for a screenplay based on Pellicano's case, and Rossini helped her out by illegally accessing FBI computers to get her information on the case. In reality, Fiorentino wanted to assist Pellicano, and handed the files over to Pellicano's lawyers. Rossini, in addition to resigning from the FBI after 17 years as a special agent, pled guilty in 2009 and received a sentence of 12 months probation and a $5,000 fine.

References

External links 
 List of articles about Pellicano articles. Los Angeles Times 2006.
 .
 Auletta "Deadline Hollywood", The New Yorker July 16, 2006.
 Announcement of Pellicano biography by John Connolly.
 Sixty-page indictment against Pellicano and six others. February 6, 2006.
 Superseding indictment charging Pellicano attorney associate. The Smoking Gun website. February 15, 2006.
 Copy of Busch's lawsuit against Pellicano. The Smoking Gun website.

1944 births
American gangsters of Italian descent
Living people
People convicted of racketeering
People from Chicago
Private detectives and investigators
People convicted of illegal possession of weapons